North Athens is one of the regional units of Greece. It is part of the region of Attica. The regional unit covers the northeast-central part of the agglomeration of Athens.

Administration

As a part of the 2011 Kallikratis government reform, the regional unit North Athens was created out of part of the former Athens Prefecture. It is subdivided into 12 municipalities. These are (number as in the map in the infobox):

Agia Paraskevi (3)
Amarousio (8)
Chalandri (35)
Filothei-Psychiko (33)
Irakleio (17)
Kifisia (21)
Lykovrysi-Pefki (22)
Metamorfosi (23)
Nea Ionia (25) 
Papagou-Cholargos (28)
Penteli (29)
Vrilissia (9)

See also
List of settlements in Attica

References

 
Regional units of Attica
2011 establishments in Greece